Ryan Anthony Gomes (born September 1, 1982) is an American professional basketball coach and former player who is the head coach for the Cold Hearts of Overtime Elite (OTE). He was named a First Team All-American power forward at Providence College before being selected with the 50th overall pick in the 2005 NBA draft by the Boston Celtics.

High school career
Gomes attended Wilby High School, where he was the captain of the basketball team during his final two seasons, averaging 26.9 points, 16 rebounds, 5.0 assists and 3.0 blocks per game. Gomes was awarded the Billy Finn Award as the top player in Waterbury, as well as being named Naugatuck Valley League MVP. During his high school days, Gomes also pitched on his baseball team where he recorded a .013 ERA. He received collegiate scholarship offers from Vanderbilt, Florida and LSU but ultimately chose to attend Providence College.

College career
Gomes played his college career for Providence averaging 18.4 points, 8.9 rebounds, 2.3 assists and 1.6 steals in 35.1 minutes in his four years with the Friars. He had his best year as a junior, tallying 18.9 points, 9.4 rebounds, 2.3 assists and 1.6 steals per game which earned him a Consensus First Team All-American.

Professional career

Boston Celtics (2005–2007)

2005–06 season
Wearing number 4, Gomes was expected to play off the bench in his rookie season spelling Celtics star Paul Pierce. His playing time and statistical impact were limited early in the season. However, on January 26, 2006, the Celtics executed a multiplayer trade with the Minnesota Timberwolves that freed up roster space for Gomes to play. Soon after that, fellow Celtic Kendrick Perkins was injured and Gomes was inserted in the starting line-up.

After becoming a starter, Gomes excelled, and kept his job even after Perkins returned. On February 24, 2006 he collected 17 rebounds and scored 13 points in a win over the Portland Trail Blazers. Gomes scored at least 10 points in 21 of the 29 games he started in 2006, and in 7 of those games he also had a double-double. The second half of his rookie season was a definite success.

Gomes was named to NBA All-Rookie Second Team for the 2005–06 season, and chose to play in the Celtics' 2006 NBA summer-league team. Gomes was named to the summer league all-first team for the second consecutive year.

2006–07 season
Gomes continued to make a significant impact starting 60 games for the Celtics in the 2006–07 season. Gomes averaged more than 30 minutes played, scoring 12.1 points per game, along with 1.6 assists and 5.6 rebounds. On November 8, 2006 Gomes recorded his first career triple-double collecting 10 points, 12 rebounds, and a career-high 10 assists against the Charlotte Bobcats in the Celtics' first win of the 2006–07 season after an 0–3 start. On January 20, Gomes scored a career-high 31 points in a January 20, 2007 overtime loss to the Washington Wizards. Coming off the bench on March 4, Gomes tied his career-high of 17 rebounds and scored 21 points while playing a total of 52 minutes in a double overtime victory against the Minnesota Timberwolves.

On March 7, Gomes sprained his left foot and did not play in the second half of the game against the Houston Rockets. He sat out the following 7 games, and returned to the Celtics' roster playing limited minutes beginning on March 21. Near the end of the season, Gomes began regularly shooting three-point shots, making 14 of 34 in April, after shooting only 5 for 17 in his career to that point.

Gomes attracted the attention of the national media for comments he made following a Celtics' loss to the Milwaukee Bucks on April 13. Neither Gomes nor starting point guard Rajon Rondo played in the game's final, decisive minutes. After, Gomes said, "I probably (would have played), but since we were in the hunt for a high draft pick, of course things are different." This was the first public comment by a Celtic in 2007 implying that the team was losing games purposely, to improve their status for the 2007 NBA draft.

Minnesota Timberwolves (2007–2010) 

On July 31, 2007, Gomes was traded along with Gerald Green, Al Jefferson, Theo Ratliff, Sebastian Telfair, and draft picks, to the Minnesota Timberwolves for Kevin Garnett. On January 21, 2008, Gomes scored a career high 35 points against the Golden State Warriors in a 109–108 win. Gomes played in all 82 Timberwolves games in 2007–08, starting 74 of them, and he averaged 12.6 points, 5.8 rebounds, and 1.8 assists per game.

Gomes also played in all 82 games in the 2008–09 season in which he set a career high in points scored per game (13.3).

On June 24, 2010, Gomes was traded to the Portland Trail Blazers with the draft rights to Luke Babbitt for Martell Webster. Gomes was waived by Portland on June 29, 2010.

Los Angeles Clippers (2010–2012) 
On July 8, 2010, Gomes was signed by the Clippers. He was waived by the team on July 17, 2012, via the amnesty clause.

Artland Dragons (2012–2013) 
On November 22, 2012, Gomes signed with the Artland Dragons of Germany's Basketball Bundesliga.

Oklahoma City Thunder (2013–2014) 
On August 7, 2013, Gomes signed with the Oklahoma City Thunder.

On January 7, 2014, a three-team trade was completed between the Thunder, the Boston Celtics, and the Memphis Grizzlies. Oklahoma City traded Gomes to Boston in exchange for second round draft picks in 2014 and 2017 from the Grizzlies; he was subsequently waived by the Celtics. As part of the transaction, the Grizzlies also traded Jerryd Bayless to the Celtics in exchange for Courtney Lee.

Laboral Kutxa (2014)
On September 11, 2014, Gomes signed with Laboral Kutxa of Spain. On October 27, 2014, he parted ways with Laboral Kutxa, after playing only one game in the ACB League.

Los Angeles D-Fenders (2016)
On January 7, 2016, Gomes was acquired by the Los Angeles D-Fenders of the NBA Development League. Over the course of the 2015–16 season, he scored in double figures 28 times, including two 30-plus-point outings, and recorded nine double-doubles. He subsequently earned NBA D-League Impact Player of the Year and led the D-Fenders to the D-League Finals where they were defeated 2–1 by the Sioux Falls Skyforce. In 40 games for the D-Fenders, he averaged 18.7 points, 8.2 rebounds and 2.9 assists per game. At the season's end, he was named to the All-NBA D-League Third Team.

Coaching career
On August 23, 2016, Gomes was appointed an assistant coach of the Long Island Nets, a new NBA Development League franchise.

In August 2021, Gomes was named the head coach of Team Overtime, a team that competes in the prep basketball league Overtime Elite (OTE).

NBA career statistics

Regular season

|-
| align="left" | 
| align="left" | Boston
| 61 || 33 || 22.6 || .487 || .333 || .752 || 4.9 || 1.0 || .6 || .1 || 7.6
|-
| align="left" | 
| align="left" | Boston
| 73 || 60 || 31.2 || .467 || .381 || .811 || 5.6 || 1.6 || .7 || .2 || 12.1
|-
| align="left" | 
| align="left" | Minnesota
| 82 || 74 || 29.7 || .457 || .330 || .830 || 5.8 || 1.8 || .8 || .1 || 12.6
|-
| align="left" | 
| align="left" | Minnesota
| 82 || 76 || 31.9 || .431 || .372 || .807 || 4.8 || 1.6 || .8 || .3 || 13.3
|-
| align="left" | 
| align="left" | Minnesota
| 76 || 64 || 29.1 || .447 || .372 || .825 || 4.6 || 1.6 || .8 || .2 || 10.9
|-
| align="left" | 
| align="left" | L.A. Clippers
| 76 || 62 || 27.6 || .410 || .341 || .718 || 3.3 || 1.6 || .8 || .2 || 7.2
|-
| align="left" | 
| align="left" | L.A. Clippers
| 32 || 2 || 13.3 || .326 || .138 || .727 || 1.9 || .4 || .5 || .0 || 2.3
|-
| align="left" | 
| align="left" | Oklahoma City
| 5 || 0 || 6.8 || .375 || .000 || .000 || .8 || .2 || .0 || .0 || 1.2
|- class="sortbottom"
| style="text-align:center;" colspan="2"| Career
| 482 || 371 || 27.9 || .445 || .349 || .799 || 4.6 || 1.5 || .7 || .2 || 10.1

See also
 List of NCAA Division I men's basketball players with 2,000 points and 1,000 rebounds

References

External links

NBA.com profile
Euroleague.net profile
Spanish League profile 
Providence Friars bio
Ryan Gomes On His Basketball Journey

1982 births
Living people
African-American basketball players
All-American college men's basketball players
American expatriate basketball people in Germany
American expatriate basketball people in Spain
American men's basketball players
American people of Cape Verdean descent
Artland Dragons players
Basketball coaches from Connecticut
Basketball players from Connecticut
Big3 players
Boston Celtics draft picks
Boston Celtics players
Liga ACB players
Long Island Nets coaches
Los Angeles Clippers players
Los Angeles D-Fenders players
Minnesota Timberwolves players
Oklahoma City Thunder players
Power forwards (basketball)
Providence Friars men's basketball players
Saski Baskonia players
Small forwards
Sportspeople from Waterbury, Connecticut
21st-century African-American sportspeople
20th-century African-American people
American men's 3x3 basketball players